The 2018 Summit League women's soccer tournament was the postseason women's soccer tournament for the Summit League held on November 1 and 3, 2018. The three-match tournament took place at Fishback Soccer Park in Brookings, South Dakota. The four-team single-elimination tournament consisted of two rounds based on seeding from regular season conference play. The Denver Pioneers were the defending champions, and successfully defended their title with a 4–0 victory over the Omaha Mavericks in the final.  The win earned Denver the conference's automatic bid to the NCAA tournament. The tournament win was Denver's third as a member of the conference, all of which have come under coach Jeff Hooker.

Bracket

Source:

Schedule

Semifinals

Final

Statistics

Goalscorers 
3 Goals
 Bailey Cascio – Omaha
 Camryn MacMillan – Denver

1 Goal
 Hannah Adler – Denver
 Carina McLennan – South Dakota St.

Own Goals
 Omaha vs. Denver

All-Tournament team

Source:

See also 
 Summit League
 2018 NCAA Division I women's soccer season
 2018 NCAA Division I Women's Soccer Tournament
 2018 Summit League Men's Soccer Tournament

References 

Summit League Women's Soccer Tournament
2018 Summit League women's soccer season